Hi-Pointe is a neighborhood of St. Louis, Missouri, within a section known as Dogtown. It is bounded by Clayton Avenue and Oakland Avenue on the north, City Limits on the west, Dale Avenue on the south, and Louisville Avenue on the east. It is bordered by the Skinker-DeBaliviere neighborhood and Forest Park on the north, the Clayton-Tamm neighborhood on the east, the Franz Park neighborhood on the south and the city of Richmond Heights, part of St. Louis County on the west.

The Hi-Pointe area takes its name from being one of the highest points in the City of St. Louis. The Par Lounge and the Hi-Pointe Theatre, the oldest still operating movie theater in St Louis,  are both located in the Hi-Pointe.  There are between 750 and 800 separate homes, apartment buildings, condominium buildings and businesses in this area. There is a fire station, a school, a bank and many other business establishments. The area is mostly residential in nature.

Demographics

In 2020 Hi-Pointe's racial makeup was 80.2% White, 6.3% Black, 0.2% Native American, 5.3% Asian, 6.6% Two or More Races, and 1.4% Some Other Race. 3.5% of the population was of Hispanic or Latino origin.

References

External links
 Neighborhood Website

Irish-American culture in Missouri
Irish-American neighborhoods
Neighborhoods in St. Louis